WKC may refer to:
WKC Stahl- und Metallwarenfabrik of Solingen, Germany
WKC (Baltimore), a Baltimore, Maryland AM radio station licensed from 1922 to 1923
West Kent College
West Kowloon Corridor, a highway in Kowloon, Hong Kong
Weyersberg, Kirschbaum, and Cie of Solingen, Germany
World Kendo Championship
White Knight Chronicles
Winston Knoll Collegiate
 Woodbridge Kart Club
 World Kendo Championship